Pelkey is a surname. Notable people with the surname include:

 Amanda Pelkey (born 1993), American ice hockey forward
 Arthur Pelkey (1884–1921), Canadian boxer 
 Charles Pelkey (born 1958), American politician
 Michael Pelkey (born 1940), American skydiver
 Robin Pelkey (born 1963), American murder victim

See also
 Dan's City Used Cars, Inc. v. Pelkey, 2013 United States Supreme Court case
 Pelkey Lake, in Minnesota